Potamyia is a genus of netspinning caddisflies in the family Hydropsychidae. There are more than 20 described species in Potamyia.

Species
These 27 species belong to the genus Potamyia:

 Potamyia arachne Malicky, 1998
 Potamyia aureipennis (Ulmer, 1930)
 Potamyia baenzigeri Malicky & Chantaramongkol in Malicky, 1997
 Potamyia bicornis Li & Tian in Tian, Yang & Li, 1996
 Potamyia chinensis (Ulmer, 1915)
 Potamyia czekanovskii (Martynov, 1910)
 Potamyia daphne Malicky, 1998
 Potamyia dentifera (Ulmer, 1930)
 Potamyia dryope Malicky & Thani in Malicky, 2000
 Potamyia echigoensis (Tsuda, 1949)
 Potamyia flava (Hagen, 1861)
 Potamyia flavata (Banks, 1934)
 Potamyia horvati Malicky & Chantaramongkol in Malicky, 1997
 Potamyia huberti Malicky, 1997
 Potamyia jinhongensis Li & Tian in Tian, Yang & Li, 1996
 Potamyia nikalandugola (Schmid, 1958)
 Potamyia panakeia Malicky & Chantaramongkol in Malicky, 1997
 Potamyia peitho Malicky & Chantaramongkol in Malicky, 1997
 Potamyia periboia Malicky & Chantaramongkol in Malicky, 1997
 Potamyia phaidra Malicky & Chantaramongkol in Malicky, 1997
 Potamyia proboscida Li & Tian in Tian, Yang & Li, 1996
 Potamyia renatae Malicky, 1997
 Potamyia siveci Malicky, 1997
 Potamyia straminea (McLachlan, 1875)
 Potamyia trilobata Ulmer, 1932
 Potamyia yunnanica (Schmid, 1959)
 † Potamyia nitida Ulmer, 1912

References

Further reading

 
 
 

Trichoptera genera
Articles created by Qbugbot